2022 Arab Basketball Championship for Men National Teams was the 24th edition of the Arab Basketball Championship, a men's basketball regional championship of Arab world that ended with Lebanon being crowned winner. The tournament was hosted by UAE for the first time and featured 16 teams.

Host selection
The Arab Confederation of basketball proceeded Saturday 6/02/2022 to a reorganization of the program of the 24th edition of the Arab Nations Championship, to be held from 8 to 16 February in Dubai, United Arab Emirates (UAE), following the defection of Syria

Draw
9 Team entered the game on first but Morocco and Syria withdrew the tournament.

The 7 team divided into two groups.

Squads

Each team consisted of 12 players.

Tunisia :

Venues
The tournament was hosted in Dubai in Rashid Bin Hamdan Hall, the complex belongs to Al-Nasr SC.

Preliminary round

Group A

Group B

Knockout stage

Bracket

Quarter-finals

Semi-finals

Third place

Final

Final standings

Statistics and awards

Statistical leaders

Players
 

 

Rebounds

Assists

Blocks

Steals

Efficiency

Teams
 

Points

Rebounds

Assists

Blocks

Steals

Efficiency

Awards

Broadcasting 
Arab basketball federation web site :abbconf
Dubai Sports

References

2022
Basketball
Basketball competitions in Africa between national teams
Basketball competitions in Asia between national teams